Harry Lee is an American shell collector. He has named 36 species and has had 18 others named for him. He is considered one of the top amateur experts in the field of mollusks. He is donating his collection, one of the world's largest, to the Florida Museum of Natural History at the University of Florida.

Lee lives in Citrus County, Florida and is married with two children.

Selected publications 

 
Lyons, William G., and Harry G. Lee. "Fasciolaria gigantea Kiener, 1840 (currently Triplofusus giganteus; Mollusca, Gastropoda, Fasciolariidae): the correct name for the horse conch of the southeastern United States and Mexico." The Bulletin of Zoological Nomenclature 75, no. 1 (2018): 195-203.
Lee, Harry G. "Genera of American Strombid Gastropods (Gastropoda: Strombidae) and Remarks on Their Phylogený." Veliger 49, no. 4 (2007): 256-264.
Lee, Harry G. "Partulid snails, their collectors, and a prodigious dynasty of French naturalists." American Conchologist 40, no. 1 (2012): 10-19.
Lee, Harry G. "Shelled land snails of the Calusa shell mound, Ding Darling National Wildlife Refuge, Sanibel Island, and of Lee County, Florida." Florida Scientist (2014): 2-14.

References

Further reading 

 
 
 
 

Mollusc shells
American collectors

Year of birth missing (living people)
Living people